The  is a 6.8 km railway line owned by the Heisei Chikuhō Railway. The line runs north from Tagawa to Kanada Station, all within Fukuoka Prefecture.

History

The Itoda Line was built in two parts. It ran north from Gotōji Station (now Tagawa-Gotōji Station) to Miyatoko Station (now Itoda Station). Hōshū Railway was acquired by Kyushu Railway in 1901, which was then nationalized in 1907 into Japanese Government Railways (JGR) under the Railway Nationalization Act.

In 1927, another third-sector railway company, built the section between Miyatoko and Kanada Station. The line was sold in 1943 during the Second World War to JGR, who operated the entire line as the Itoda Line.

With the privatization of the Japanese National Railways (successor of the JGR) in 1987, the Itoda Line fell under the control of Kyushu Railway Company (JR Kyushu). Then, in 1989, the Itoda Line was transferred to the Heisei Chikuhō Railway, along with the Ita Line and Tagawa Line.

Operations
The line is not electrified and is single-tracked for the entire line.

There is generally an hourly service in each direction. All trains run as local services and stop at all stations. A few services continue past Kanada Station on the Ita Line to Nōgata Station.

Stations
All stations are within Fukuoka Prefecture.

References

 
Railway lines in Japan
Rail transport in Fukuoka Prefecture
Railway lines opened in 1897
Japanese third-sector railway lines